Nationalism was a central force in the history of Finland for the last two centuries. The Finnish national awakening in the mid-19th century was the result of members of the Swedish-speaking upper classes deliberately choosing to promote Finnish culture and language as a means of nation building—i.e. to establish a feeling of unity between all people in Finland including (and not of least importance) between the ruling elite and the ruled peasantry. The publication in 1835 of the Finnish national epic, the Kalevala, a collection of traditional myths and legends which is the folklore common to the Finns and to the Karelian people (the Finnic Russian Orthodox people who inhabit the Lake Ladoga-region of eastern Finland and present-day NW Russia), stirred the nationalism that later led to Finland's independence from Russia.

Nationalism was contested by the pro-Russian element and by the internationalism of the labor movement. The result was a tendency toward class conflict over nationalism, but in the early 1900s the working classes split into the Valpas (class struggle emphasis) and Mäkelin (nationalist emphasis).

Language

Particularly following Finland's incorporation into the Swedish central administration during the 16th and 17th centuries, Swedish was spoken by about 15% of the population, especially the upper and middle classes. Swedish was the language of administration, public institutions, education and cultural life—only the peasants spoke Finnish. The emergence of Finnish to predominance resulted from a 19th-century surge of Finnish nationalism, aided by Russian bureaucrats attempting to separate Finns from Sweden and to ensure the Finns' loyalty.

In 1863, the Finnish language gained an official position in administration. The language issue overlapped both liberalism and nationalism, and showed some a class conflict as well, with the peasants pitted against the conservative Swedish-speaking landowners and nobles. Complicating this, the Finnish activists divided into "old" (no compromise on the language question and conservative nationalism) and "young" (liberation from Russia) Finns. The leading liberals were Swedish-speaking intellectuals who called for more democracy; they became the radical leaders after 1880. The liberals organized for social democracy, labor unions, farm cooperatives, and women's rights.

In 1892, Finnish finally became an equal official language and gained a status comparable to that of Swedish. Nevertheless, the Swedish language continued to be the language of culture, arts and business into the 1920s. Legislation since 1922 gives Finnish and Swedish equal official status. By 2000, Swedish was the first language of about 6% of the population, or 300,000 people. However, since the late 20th century there has been a steady migration of older, better-educated Swedish speakers to Sweden.

Social movements

Movements toward Finnish national pride, as well as liberalism in politics and economics involved ethnic and class dimensions. The nationalist movement against Russia began with the Fennoman movement led by Hegelian philosopher Johan Vilhelm Snellman in the 1830s. Snellman sought to apply philosophy to social action and moved the basis of Finnish nationalism to establishment of the language in the schools, while remaining loyal to the czar. Fennomania became the Finnish Party in the 1860s.

Liberalism was the central issue of the 1860s to 1880s.

in 2000 Suomen Sisu, an association that seeks to promote Finnish nationalism was founded.

Educating the Finns in national identity

Schools
Under Russian rule there was a strong grass-roots informal people's enlightenment, based on the Society for the Advancement of Popular Education, run by Swedish elites. It promoted folk high schools teaching in Finnish and youth movements with lessons centered around patriotic and nationalist themes. The Swedish elites after 1850 also promoted public festivals with patriotic themes, hoping to both instill nationalism and draw the Finnish-speaking peasants and workers away from socialist movements that downplayed nationalism.  Team sports and rowing competitions became favorite attractions, and all the festivals began with speeches.

When independence came, the schools were redesigned to instill Finnish nationalism. Jokela and Linkola (2013) examined the photographs in Finnish geography textbooks and tourist guides in the 1920s and conclude they were an integral part of the everyday teaching of nationalism. Finnish writers, intellectuals and academics saw themselves as part of the authoritative system or "state idea" that represented the entire national territory.

Media
In the days of Russian rule, music and opera became vehicles for the expression of nationalism. Jean Sibelius (1865–1957) especially used traditional Finnish folk tunes as the basis of nationalistic compositions. Nationalist painters were for example Akseli Gallen-Kallela.

Independent Finland used its postage stamps to help construct national narrative, a collective memory, and its self-image. Everyone used stamps routinely so it was an inexpensive way to reach the entire population with a popular heroic version of the national story. The stamps provided a simplified visual history of the evolution of the Finnish state, nation and society.

References

Further reading
  Full text. 
 
  (Covers 1820 to 1910.)
 
 
 
 
 
 

 
Political history of Finland